The Kidako moray (Gymnothorax kidako) is a species of marine fish in the family Muraenidae. It inhabits coral reefs or lagoons and could be found in tropical and subtropical seas near Taiwan, Japan, and Australia. The species is diurnal, which means it is more active in the daytime than the nighttime. It is also piscivorous: it consumes fish, octopus, and squid. Other than the Kidako moray, there are about 200 species of moray eels in the Muraenidae family. The Kidako moray would not attack humans unless they are provoked. However, due to the menacing looks of the Kidako moray and moray eels in general, they are feared by divers and snorkelers.

Description
The Kidako moray is a medium size fish that can reach a maximum length of 91cm.
It has a brownish color with white spots (snowflake-like) on its head, body and fins. It also has a pattern of blotches all over its body. They continue onto its tail. However, some of the patterns  disappear as they get closer to the tail. The snout and chin are brown with yellow streaks.

Distribution and habitat
Morays are commonly found in warm-temperature areas like tropical and subtropical seas. Specifically, the Kidako moray is widespread throughout the western to central Ocean Pacific area from Taiwan to Polynesia, including Hawaii, and from south Japan and Korea to New-Caledonia. The Kidako moray usually inhabits coral reefs or lagoons. They hide in rocky bottoms, but they expose their heads occasionally. Some of them also reside in waters up to 400 meters deep, where there is a lower temperature compared to the shallower areas where most of the moray eels inhabit. In addition, morays are usually known to be nocturnal; however, observation has discovered that many of them are also diurnal.
 
Sometimes, the Kidako moray, which is quite common in some areas in Japan, is used for food. It is harvested in some minor commercial fisheries.

Dietary Habits 
The Kidako moray is piscivorous. It consumes fish and cephalopods such as octopuses and squids to survive. The dietary habits of morays could be divided into two types, piscivory and durophagy. Feeding types differ depending on the sharpness of the teeth as well as the shape or size of the jaws. The species that have long caniniform teeth are more likely to consume octopus, fish, and crustaceans occasionally. On the other hand, species with molariform or short caniniform teeth tend to consume more on crustaceans.

Taxonomy 
The Kidako moray belongs to the genus called Gymnothorax under the Muraenidae family with other 15 genera, including Anarchias, Channomuraena, Cirrimaxilla, Diaphenchelys, Echidna, Enchelyore, Enchelynassa, Gymnomuraena, Monopenchelys, Muraena, Pseudechidna, Rhinomuraena, Scuticaria, Strophidon, and Uropterygius. According to some studies, the Muraenidae family originated 34 to 54 million years ago in the Pacific Ocean. There are approximately 200 species of moray eels split across 16 genera globally. Some species of moray eels are commonly served as a delicacy in various countries such as Portugal, Japan, and Vietnam. Moreover, there are around 122 species under the genus Gymnothorax. They are similar to each other but have some different features and characteristics. Some of these are G. austrinus, G. berndti, G. conspersus, G. cribroris, G. dorsalis, G. dovii, G. elegans, G. fuscomaculatus, G. gracilicauda, G. isingteena, G. javanicus, G. johnsoni, G. tile, G. nasuta, G. ocellatus, G. punctatofasciatus, G. punctatus, G. reticularis, G. unicolor, and G. vagrans.

Relationships with humans 

It is rare to see moray eels making unprovoked attacks on humans. However, it is true that the baleful looks of moray eels frighten snorkelers and divers underwater. Humans are afraid of moray eels due to their appearance. When moray eels carry out a normal respiratory movement, focus is drawn to their protruding large jaws and dentition. They activate a protection mechanism by extending their jaws widely to the direction of the threat when encountering an intruder. However, moray eel attacks are rare as it is mainly due to misunderstanding when divers carry out reckless acts of placing their hand into a hole in the reef.

Some species of the moray eels are also able to cause wounds. Three similar cases were found during research of moray eels, and the common facts between those three were that all moray eels had serrated teeth. Researchers speculated that they were venomous, however, no study has been able to prove this.

Few death cases were reported from consuming moray eels. As moray eels are being used as food in some places, fish poisoning has the chance to happen. On Saipan island, 57 people were reportedly poisoned by consuming moray 12 inches thick. This caused 2 deaths and 14 of them became comatose. Later in the investigation, it was found to be a typical ciguatera poisoning. The poison has a highly toxic compound that could show its highest levels in a large moray.

Anatomy

General 
The research established by Böhlke and Randall has shown the measurements of the body parts from a few large samples of the Kidako moray with a tapering tail. Some of the samples of the Kidako moray used  were up to 915mm long. The measurements that the study expresses are proportions in terms of the total length or head length. Total length is measured from the snout tip to the tip of the tail and head length is measured from the snout tip to the posterodorsal margin of the gill opening. The length of the pre-anal is measured to the mid-anus, and the length of the snout is measured from the snout tip to the anterior margin of the eye. The gill opening is where the body depth is measured, and the fin is not included for the measurement at the anus. The upper jaw length is measured until the external inner angle of the mouth from the snout tip. Except for the measurements of proportions in terms of total length or head length, the vertebral counts are also included.

Its gill opening has a depth of approximately 12 to 21, anus measured before mid-body is approximately 14 to 26 in total length, and the length of the pre-anal is 2.1 to 2.5 in total length. The Kidako moray has a moderate elongate head of 7.2 to 9 in total length with a long and narrow snout that is 4.0 to 5.8 in head length. Additionally, a long jaw that is 2.0 to 2.6 in head length and small eyes above its mid-gape that are 8.4 to 14 in head length. The anatomical position of its nostril is long and narrow like a tube and the posterior nostril is located above and before the anterior margin of the eye. Its branchial pores are found at the upper part and before the gill opening. The dorsal fin is between the gill opening and rictus, and above the first branchial pore. The gill opening has an elliptical slit at the mid-side. The Kidako moray has 136 to 149 vertebrae, consisting of 4 to 7 vertebrae placed at the pre-dorsal and 52 to 58 vertebrae placed at the pre-anal.

Jaw 
Moray eels have pharyngeal jaws and are categorised into two types of feeding habits, piscivorous or durophagous. The piscivorous morays have longer jaws and teeth, and narrower heads compared to durophagous morays. Durophagous morays have shorter jaws, short, blunt teeth, and larger depths of dentary. The Kidako moray falls into the category of piscivorous with pharyngeal jaws. The jaws of the Kidako moray, or moray eels in general, hold a dual-jaw system for feeding. They primarily use the oral jaws to deliver prey into the esophagus with sharp and piercing teeth. The teeth are curved backward and point towards its throat to avoid prey coming back out of its mouth. After they transport prey, they use the pharyngeal jaws to crush it. During pre-digestion, the pharyngeal jaws crush, shred, and prepare prey for digestion. Moreover, a piscivorous moray is also assumed to have larger adductor muscles in the pharyngeal jaws for them to be able to carry and transport large fish.

Teeth 
The Kidako moray generally has large and uniserial teeth except for small specimens. It has six large teeth on the peripheral part of the inter-maxillary segment with the smallest pair at the most anatomical position. Others include 1 to 3 tiny flanking teeth, 3 long median teeth, and 8 to 16 maxillary teeth. However, the size decreases posteriorly. On the contrary, specimens with less than 300mm have 1 to 3 inner teeth, and 4 to 14 tiny and staggered teeth on vomer which is hard to find on large specimens. Small specimens also have 2 to 4 large or 1 to 4 small teeth anteriorly. Unlike the large specimens, small specimens have 13 to 23 teeth that continue as row and become larger as it is closer to the back.

Length-weight relationships 

Further research by Loh has found that there is a relationship between the length and the weight of moray eels, including the Kidako moray. Luh measured from the tip of the closed mouth to the beginning of the anal fin rays. Its head width is the width from suspensorium to suspensorium with the mouth closed. Head length is the distance from the tip of the rostrum to the neurocranium-vertebral joint and head height is measured from the bottom of the dentary directly below the eye to the top of the head above the eye. The table below shows the data from 9 samples of the Kidako moray. The average standard length of the Kidako moray being observed is approximately 63.15 cm and the average weight of the Kidako moray being observed is approximately 627.25g. The length range and weight range are broad due to the combined sexes of samples. The correlations between the length and the weight are also found from other moray eels such as G. chilospilus, G. meleagris, and G. pictus.

References

External links
http://www.marinespecies.org/aphia.php?p=taxdetails&id=271843
http://eol.org/pages/216831/details
http://www.fishbase.org/summary/10143
http://www.itis.gov/servlet/SingleRpt/SingleRpt?search_topic=TSN&search_value=161216
Fishes of Australia : Gymnothorax kidako
https://media.australian.museum/media/Uploads/Journals/17901/1325_complete.pdf 

Kidako moray
Marine fauna of East Asia
Marine fish of Eastern Australia
Kidako moray

Eels
Muraenidae
Moray